Marcos Alejandro Lencina (born March 29, 1973 in Pergamino (Buenos Aires), Argentina) is a former Argentine footballer who played for clubs of Argentina, Chile, Spain, England and Italy.

Teams
  Douglas Haig 1997-1998
  Provincial Osorno 1998
  UD Lleida 1999
  Swansea City 2000-2001
  Castellana 2002-2006
  Yupanqui 2006-2007

External links
 
 Marcos Lencina at playmakerstats.com (English version of ceroacero.es)

1973 births
Living people
Argentine footballers
Argentine expatriate footballers
Club Atlético Douglas Haig players
Provincial Osorno footballers
Chilean Primera División players
Expatriate footballers in Chile
Expatriate footballers in Spain
Expatriate footballers in Italy
Expatriate footballers in England
Association football forwards
People from Pergamino
Sportspeople from Buenos Aires Province